Ded Bushi (born 2 October 1998) is an Albanian professional footballer who plays as a midfielder for Albanian club KF Besëlidhja Lezhë and the Albania national under-20 football team.

Club career

Laçi
Bushi was first included in the senior squad in May 2016 where he was in the team for the league fixture versus Skënderbeu Korçë. He made his professional debut by playing in the first 37 minutes of the match before making space for Endri Muçmata in an overwhelming 6–1 away loss. This was his only appearance of the 2015–16 season.

He played only twice in the following season, featuring twice as a substitute in the league matches versus Teuta Durrës and Korabi Peshkopi.

Bushi found more space to play in the 2017–18 season where he amassed 12 league appearances, collecting 359 minutes as Laçi finished in 4th position which returned them to UEFA Europa League after three years. He scored his first senior goal in the 12–0 crushing win of Laçi versus Sopoti Librazhd in the first round of 2017–18 Albanian Cup. He was on target again in this competition, scoring the third of a 3–1 win at Lushnja in the first leg of second round. Laçi eventually made their way to the final, where they were defeated 1–0 by Skënderbeu Korçë via a controversial penalty of Sabien Lilaj, with Bushi remaining on bench.

In July 2018, new manager Besnik Prenga included him in the team for the 2018–19 UEFA Europa League campaign. He made his debut in the competition on 19 July by entering in the final 10 minutes of the second leg match versus Anorthosis Famagusta with Laçi winning 1–0 and progressing to the next round on away goal rule after losing the first leg.

International career
Bushi burst on to the international scene in 2017 where he was called up by Alban Bushi of the Albania under-20 side for the friendly match against Georgia. He entered as a substitute in the 65th minute for Agon Mucolli in an eventual 3–0 loss.

Career statistics

References

External links
FSHF profile

1998 births
Living people
People from Laç
Albanian footballers
Albania youth international footballers
Association football midfielders
KF Laçi players
Besëlidhja Lezhë players
Kategoria Superiore players
Kategoria e Parë players